Brenda Damaris Cerén Delgado (born 24 September 1998) is a Salvadoran footballer who plays as a forward for Alianza FC and El Salvador women's national team.

Early life
Cerén was born in Quezaltepeque.

Club career
Cerén has played for CD Ópico and Legends FC in El Salvador. She joined Alianza FC in 2017.

International career
Cerén represented El Salvador at two CONCACAF Women's U-20 Championship qualification editions (2015 and 2018) and the 2017 Central American Games. She capped at senior level during the 2018 CONCACAF Women's Championship qualification and the 2020 CONCACAF Women's Olympic Qualifying Championship qualification.

Personal life
Cerén's brothers, Darwin and Óscar, and sister Paola are footballers as well.

See also
List of El Salvador women's international footballers

References 

1998 births
Living people
People from Quezaltepeque
Salvadoran women's footballers
Women's association football forwards
El Salvador women's international footballers